Akbar Musazai (born 12 May 1996) is an Afghan cricketer. He made his first-class debut for Speen Ghar Region in the 2018 Ahmad Shah Abdali 4-day Tournament on 22 April 2018. He made his List A debut for Nangarhar Province in the 2019 Afghanistan Provincial Challenge Cup tournament on 31 July 2019.

References

External links
 

1996 births
Living people
Afghan cricketers
Spin Ghar Tigers cricketers
Place of birth missing (living people)